Revaz Tevdoradze (born 14 February 1988) is a Georgian professional football player, currently playing for FC Merani Tbilisi.

External links
 
 

1988 births
Living people
Association football goalkeepers
Footballers from Georgia (country)
Expatriate footballers from Georgia (country)
FC Torpedo Kutaisi players